Jonas Struß (born 26 September 1997) is a German footballer who plays as a centre-back for BSG Wismut Gera.

References

External links
 

German footballers
Association football defenders
FC Rot-Weiß Erfurt players
3. Liga players
People from Celle (district)
1997 births
Living people
Footballers from Lower Saxony